Bethmann Bank AG is a German private bank headquartered in Frankfurt am Main. It is a subsidiary of the Dutch ABN AMRO Bank N.V. and was the product of a merger between the historical German banks Delbrück, Bethmann and Maffei under the umbrella of the renowned Dutch ABN AMRO Bank. LGT Bank Deutschland joined this group in 2011. Bethmann Bank acquired the German private banking activities of Credit Suisse in December 2013. The acquisition positions Bethmann Bank, ABN AMRO’s private bank in Germany, as the third largest private bank in Germany.

Bethmann Bank focuses on management, advisory services and planning for major private assets. It also supports clients in succession planning for family-owned companies and in establishing charitable foundations. The bank's archive is today located in the Frankfurt City archive. Together with the Goethe University Frankfurt am Main and F.A.Z. Media Solutions, Bethmann Bank organised a discussion series called Weltenwandler.tv, which addressed broad social issues.

History
Delbrück & Co. 
Delbrück & Co. is described as the "financier to the Prussian state". The institution supported young entrepreneurs in the late 19th century, such as Siemens and Krupp. Adelbert Delbrück was one of the founders of Deutsche Bank. Clients at Delbrück & Co and Bethmann were able to use corporate finance and asset management services long before these Anglicisms entered the German language.

Bethmann Bank
As a bank for "important projects and clients", Bethmann served Maria Theresa of Austria, Pope Pius VI, Tsar Alexander I and the Goethe family. The private bank helped to finance the construction of the Eiffel Tower and today remains one of the largest promoters of art in Frankfurt am Main.

Maffei Bank 
The Maffei family, who hailed from Verona, established their own bank in Munich in 1802 and ran it for over 100 years. The family was also a co-founder of the Bayerische Hypotheken- und Wechselbank (later HypoVereinsbank) and the insurance company Münchener Rückversicherung (later Allianz). A member of the family reopened the Maffei Bank after the Second World War. In the years that followed, it continued to move from being a specialist in securities and energy-sector lending to a pure private bank.

ABN AMRO
The forerunner of ABN AMRO was founded in the Netherlands by King William I in 1824 and began at an early stage to concentrate on world trade. The financing business led the bank to open branches on all continents, laying the foundation for today's international network.

Founding
The establishment of the Bethmann bank in Frankfurt am Main is dated to 1748, the year when Johann Philipp Bethmann (1715-1793), who had inherited the trading enterprise of his uncle Jakob Adami in 1746, officially took his brother Simon Moritz as a partner. From that point the enterprise was called Gebrüder Bethmann.

Within a short span of time, the Bethmann bank developed into one of Frankfurt's leading (Christian-owned) banks, on a scale comparable only to its younger rival, the House of Rothschild. The bank's fortunes began to rise in 1754 based on its business in imperial, princely and municipal bonds and skyrocketed from 1778, thanks to the bank's innovation of breaking the Austrian emperor's borrowing down into "sub-bonds" (Partialobligationen) at 1000 gulden each offered to the public, which made them tradeable in secondary markets. This transformed the bank from a lender to an underwriter of bond issues. At one point, the profits of Gebrüder Bethmann exceeded those of all its Frankfurt competitors together, and it ranked first among all German banks.

Historians on the halcyon years

Steamboats and railroads

Trivia

 In 1763, when Wolfgang Amadeus Mozart and his family were visiting Paris, a letter of recommendation penned by a wife of either Johann Philipp or Simon Moritz Bethmann and addressed to Baron de Grimm served as an effective door opener, as Leopold Mozart wrote afterward.
 When Johann Wolfgang Goethe traveled to Italy in 1768, he was using a bill of exchange payable by a Roman banker and drawn on the Bethmann bank, which had issued the letter to his pseudonym of Möller, not knowing the true identity of the payee.

See also

Bethmann family

Notes

Bibliography
 Claus Helbing: Die Bethmanns. Aus der Geschichte eines alten Handelshauses zu Frankfurt am Main. Gericke (publishers), Wiesbaden 1948.
 Alexander Dietz: Frankfurter Handelsgeschichte, Glashütten 1971, reprint of 1925 edition
  Egon Caesar Conte Corti: Rise of the House of Rothschild, B. Lunn (translator), Books for Business 2001 (reprint of 1928 translation published by Gollancz), Amazon.co.uk searchable online view
 Erich Achterberg: Frankfurter Bankherren, 2nd revised edition. Fritz Knapp Verlag, Frankfurt am Main 1971. This book was published without an ISBN
 Wolfgang Klötzer (ed.): Frankfurter Biographie. Erster Band A-L. Verlag Waldemar Kramer (publishers), Frankfurt am Main 1994, 
 Hans Sarkowicz (ed.): Die großen Frankfurter, Frankfurt am Main and Leipzig, 1994, 
 Ralf Roth: Stadt und Bürgertum in Frankfurt am Main, doctoral thesis, University of Frankfurt am Main, 1996
 Paul Johnson: A History of the Jews. Harper Perennial, 1988, 
 Carl-Ludwig Holtfrerich: Finanzplatz Frankfurt, Munich, 1999, 
 Carl-Ludwig Holtfrerich: Frankfurt as a Financial Center: From Medieval Trade Fair to European Banking Centre, Munich, 1999, Google Books Preview
 Niall Ferguson: The House of Rothschild. Volume 1, Money's Prophets: 1798-1848. Penguin, 1999,

External links
 Niall Ferguson: The House of Rothschild
 Zur Geschichte des Finanzplatzes Frankfurt am Main: Manuscript of 2004 talk by Michael Jurk (Historical Archive of Dresdner Bank)
 ABN AMRO Private Banking webpage showing timeline of Bethmann bank up to and past its merger into ABN AMRO
 Die Bank, die Goethes Reisen finanzierte by Claudia Wanner, article in Handelsblatt, first published 27 January 2005

Banks based in Frankfurt
Banks established in 1748
ABN AMRO
History of banking
History of Frankfurt